Wiretree is an American indie pop/indie rock band from Austin, Texas. Initially a solo project based on Kevin Peroni's homemade recordings, Wiretree now currently also includes Joshua Kaplan on guitar, Gregory White on guitar, Rachel Peroni on bass and Daniel Jones on drums. Their music is influenced by British rock, indie, singer songwriter, jazz with home-based recording and song structures. The band played one of the largest festivals in China, The Strawberry Festival in the Spring of 2013. Their fourth album, "Get Up" was released 2013.

History
Initially working under the pseudonym Wiretree, Kevin Peroni self-produced and performed the full-length album, Bouldin in 2007. The album's track, Big Coat was featured on the PBS series Roadtrip Nation.
After the release of Bouldin, Peroni recruited band members from Craigslist and his wife, Rachel joined on bass guitar to solidify the project. The group released their second effort Luck in 2009 while being named Best kept secret by Blurt Magazine. The Canadian Television series Heartland featured Wiretree's song Whirl In early 2011. On January 26, 2011, the band was recorded on Austin City Limits Satellite Sets for KLRU. Also in 2011, Back in Town was used as the opening tune for the independent movie, Hold Your Peace. In 2013, Wiretree was featured in the season 2 finale of the PBS show, Hardly Sound.  The Duplass Brothers produced movie Adult Beginners, featured two songs (Get up and The Shore) from the band in 2015.  In 2016 the band's song Get Up was featured in a National Ad Council advertisement narrated by Matthew Mcconaughey asking the public to donate to Louisiana flood victims.

Members
Kevin Peroni – vocals, guitar, piano, drums
Joshua Kaplan – guitar
Rachel Peroni – bass
Daniel Jones – drums, percussion
Gregory White – guitar

Discography

Studio albums
 Bouldin LP (US, 2007) Cobaltworks Music
 Luck LP (US, 2009) Cobaltworks Music
 Make Up LP (US, 2011) Cobaltworks Music
 Get Up LP (US, 2013) Cobaltworks Music
 Towards the Sky LP (US, 2017) Cobaltworks Music

EPs
 Self Titled EP (2005) Self-released
 Careless Creatures EP (2020) Self-released

Singles
 You've got Tonight (US, 2017) Cobaltworks Music
 Rainy Corner (US, 2018) Cobaltworks Music

Used in Film/TV
 The Song Big Coat was used in the Season 2 episode 7 for CBS show, Walker on January 16, 2021
 The Song Nightlight was used in the Season 1 episode 17 for CBS show, Walker on July 22, 2021
The Song Broken Foot was used in the Season 1 episode 7 for CBS show, Walker on March 17, 2021
The Song Get Up was used in the UK trailer for feature film, Juliet Naked on July 9, 2018
The Song The Shore was used in season 2 episode 4 of People of Earth on TBS August 14, 2017
 The Song Get Up was used in a national advertisement campaign (Ad Council) for Louisiana flood victims in September 2016.
 The songs Get Up and When You Were Young used in the Fox TV show Grandfathered in 2016
 The songs The Shore and Get Up were used in the film Adult Beginners in 2015
 The song Big Coat was used in the final episode of the ABC show Selfie in early 2015
 The song Out of my mind was used in the CBS series Person of Interest in the Spring of 2014
 The song When You Were Young was used in the CTV series Played late 2013
 The song Big Coat was used in episode 4 of Roadtrip Nation in 2008, broadcast on PBS.
 The song Get Up was used in season 4 episode 9 of The Listener on June 17, 2013, broadcast on CTV
 The song Whirl was used in season 4 episode 11 of Heartland in early 2011, broadcast on CTV
 The song Back in Town was used in the film Hold Your Peace in 2011

References

External links
Official website
Blurt Magazine, Interview: Best Kept Secret, June 25, 2009.
Under the Radar Magazine, Feature: Premiere: Satellite Song, September 11, 2009.
Magnet Magazine, Feature: MP3 at 3PM, November 8, 2009.
KLRU Television Station, Taping: Austin City Limits: Satellite Sets, January 26, 2010.

2005 establishments in Texas
Indie rock musical groups from Texas
Musical groups from Austin, Texas
Musical groups established in 2005